James Picard is a Canadian artist, teacher and humanitarian, born January 25, 1964, in Burlington, Ontario. He is known for his diversity in styles and mediums in painting and sculpture; and for being extremely prolific.

In 1988 Picard moved his young family from Toronto to Vancouver, while continuing to paint and sculpt. Since 1995, he has taught at numerous post-secondary institutions in the greater Vancouver region. He is recognized for his inspirational teaching.

Art
Picard knew from a young age that he would be an artist. As a youth, he taught himself to paint and he read extensively about art and artists. He names Francis Bacon, Pablo Picasso, Rembrandt and Monet as influences.
 Picard studied at Sheridan College and the Ontario College of Art. He worked with several artists:  Cuban watercolourist Ramon Amor, Canadian sculptor Thaddaeus Szpelowitz, Canadian painter Harold Town. Harold Town stated in a written note that Picard's talent "is rare in the art world".

Picard's philosophy is based on following one's own creative urge. He firmly rejects producing art solely for the demands of the market and  has spoken out to artists to avoid doing so. His own work defies identification as one style and ranges expressionism through traditional realism.

Teaching
Picard teaches drawing, painting and sculpture in Vancouver at various post-secondary and community locations including Emily Carr University of Art and Design, North Vancouver Neighbourhood House and Picard Studios. He has arranged student shows to give students an opportunity to show their work. He is known for his inspirational teaching that focuses on the creative process.

In 1998, Picard set up the first sculpture class for visually impaired students in the Vancouver area.

Humanitarianism

 He has also taught painting to children with cancer at the annual Camp GoodTimes since 2006  summer camp organized by the Canadian Cancer Society
 In 2015, Picard’s State of the Art show in Vancouver donated a portion of the art sales to a local charity, the CKNW Orphans’ Fund.

Selected achievements and events
 2017 - Grand Prize winner "New Media Film Festival" for the documentary The Dark and Wounded. Los Angeles, CA
 2008 Lonsdale Quay Gallery - James Picard and Students
 2007 (Annually since 2002) International Summer Centre of the Arts, Vancouver, British Columbia
 2007 Canadian Artist Series Stamp, Canada Post
 2007 Outstanding Instructor Award, 10 Years of Teaching, Vancouver School Board
 2006 July / August Blank Canvas Collaboration, Seymor Art Gallery  

 2005, April CBC TV B|Connected
 2004 Live painting with the Edmonton Symphony, Symphonia Masonica Composer George Blondheim 

 2004 - Ayden Gallery, Vancouver, solo show with over 100 pieces of work

 2004, CTV Television interview on the Vicki Gabereau Show, February 11.
 2004 Art on Paper Fair, Royal College of Art, London
 2003 Invited to Rideau Hall to meet Her Excellency the Right Honourable Adrienne Clarkson
 2003 - Pier 92, New York

 2003 Gallery 1529 James Picard Watercolours Solo Exhibit
 2002 New York City Art Fair
 2002 Off the Canvas - documentary film by Chris Hooper, Trifecta Media shown on Bravo 

  (since 1996) New York School of Art, Drawing/Sculpting, Brooklyn, Sag Harbour, Long Island, NY
 1998 Clay Sculpture for the Visually Impaired

 1998 Artist in Residence New York School of Art

 1998, CTV Television interview, Vicki Gabereau Show, MAY.
 1997 Octavia Gallery Vancouver, Solo Exhibit
 1996 Top ten finish, New York Artists' Guild Sculpture Competition

 1996 Volunteer Vancouver Recognition Award
 1994 Top ten finish, Philadelphia Sculpture Competition
  Artist to Stop AIDS
  AIDS: A Struggle for Awareness show, proceeds donated to AIDS Vancouver
 1987 New York International Art Competition, Outstanding Achievement Award

Notes

References

External links
Official website

20th-century Canadian painters
Canadian male painters
21st-century Canadian painters
OCAD University alumni
Artists from Ontario
People from Burlington, Ontario
Sheridan College alumni
1964 births
Living people
20th-century Canadian male artists
21st-century Canadian male artists